Bobrowniki  is a village in the administrative district of Gmina Otyń, within Nowa Sól County, Lubusz Voivodeship, in western Poland.

The village has a population of 650.

References

Bobrowniki